Carola Weißenberg (born 24 December 1962 in Hohenschönhausen), married surname: Fleischhauer, is a German former figure skater who represented East Germany. She is the 1978 Prize of Moscow News champion, 1979 Richmond Trophy silver medalist, and a three-time national medalist. She finished in the top ten at the 1978 World Championships and three European Championships. Her skating club was SC Dynamo Berlin.

Results

References
 skatabase

German female single skaters
1962 births
Living people